Léon Sée (23 September 1877 – 21 March 1960) was a French fencer who competed in the late 19th century and early 20th century. He was born in Lille and died in Paris.

He participated in Fencing at the 1900 Summer Olympics in Paris and won the bronze medal in the épée. He was defeated by fellow French fencer Louis Perrée in the semi-final. He also won the bronze medal in the Amateur masters épée in Paris.

References

External links

1877 births
1960 deaths
Sportspeople from Lille
French male épée fencers
Olympic bronze medalists for France
Olympic fencers of France
Fencers at the 1900 Summer Olympics
Olympic medalists in fencing
Medalists at the 1900 Summer Olympics